Anfernee Jamal Dijksteel (born 27 October 1996) is a Dutch professional footballer who plays as a right-back for Championship club Middlesbrough.

Club career
Born in Amsterdam, Dijksteel started his career in the youth team at Amsterdamsche FC before moving to England to play for the Nike Academy.

Charlton Athletic
He signed for Charlton Athletic development squad in January 2016, having played against the side in a friendly whilst playing for the Nike Academy. He remained with the development squad until the end of the season before being promoted to the first team on a number of occasions during the 2016–17 season. After impressing for Jason Euell's side he was rewarded in February 2017 with a new three-and-a-half contract extension. In August 2017, he finally made his first team debut for the Addicks in a 2–1 victory over Exeter City in the EFL Cup. He scored his first goal on Easter Monday, 22 April 2019, opening the scoring against Scunthorpe United in a 4–0 Charlton win.

Middlesbrough
On 7 August 2019, he was signed by Championship rivals Middlesbrough for £2m.

International career
Dijksteel was born in the Netherlands and is of Surinamese descent. In March 2016, he received a call-up to the Netherlands under-20 side for a friendly against Portugal. He went on to start in the match which finished as a 1–1 draw.

On 9th March 2023 Dijksteel received his first international call up to Suriname.

Career statistics

Honours
Charlton Athletic
EFL League One play-offs: 2019

References

External links

1996 births
Living people
Footballers from Amsterdam
Dutch footballers
Dutch sportspeople of Surinamese descent
Association football midfielders
Charlton Athletic F.C. players
Middlesbrough F.C. players
Netherlands youth international footballers
Dutch expatriate footballers
Nike Academy players